Regina Smendzianka (9 October 192415 September 2011) was a Polish pianist.

Biography
Regina Smendzianka was born in Toruń, and began her public performances as a child of eight surprising the audience with her mature interpretation of the classical works. In 1949 she was awarded the just resumed IV International Chopin Piano Competition's 11th prize soon after graduating from the State Higher School of Music in Kraków (at present Academy of Music in Kraków) with the highest marks. She was a disciple of Zbigniew Drzewiecki from 1950 to 1955, and subsequently launched an international career. Smendzianka held a professorship at the Fryderyk Chopin Music Academy in Warsaw (at present Fryderyk Chopin University of Music in Warsaw) until 1996, briefly serving as the institution's rector. Among her students are contemporary classical pianists such as: Andrzej Dutkiewicz, Elżbieta Karaś-Krasztel, Maria Korecka, Ewa Kupiec, Elżbieta Tarnawska, Sławomir Dobrzański, Maciej Grzybowski, Nina Drath, Jesús María Figueroa, Rosa María Delsordo, Kazimierz Brzozowski, Moto Harada, Artur Cieślak, Yumi Toyama. Smendzianka was a juror at the 1970, 1980, 1995 and 2000 editions of the Chopin Competition.

References

External links
 Great Women Pianists at the www.forte-piano-pianissimo.com.
 Biography at The Fryderyk Chopin Institute in Warsaw.

1924 births
2011 deaths
Alumni of the Academy of Music in Kraków
Academic staff of the Chopin University of Music
Prize-winners of the International Chopin Piano Competition
People from Toruń
Polish classical pianists
Polish women pianists
Women classical pianists
20th-century classical pianists
Polish women academics
Recipient of the Meritorious Activist of Culture badge
20th-century women pianists